The Greenland Women's Volleyball Championship is an annual competition for Greenlandic women's volleyball teams. It has been held since the year of 1984 Under the rule and management of the Greenland Volleyball Federation (Kalaallit Nunaanni Volleyballertartut Kattuffiat, KVK or Grønlands Volleyball Forbund, GVF  in Danish ). .

Competition Formula
The championship is held in one city over several days. The tournament consists of two stages - preliminary and final. In 2021 in the preliminary stage the teams played in one round. According to results, the two best teams advanced to the finals and played for the championship. Bronze medals were contested by teams that took 3-4 places in the preliminary stage. The championship of 2021 went to 5 teams: AVI (Manitsok), I-69 (Ilulissat), KT-VI (Kangaamyut), PVN (Nuuk), KIF-70 (Kasigiannguit). I-69 won the championship title by defeating AVI 3–1 in the final. Third place went to KT-VI.

List of winners

Titles by club

References

External links
 Old Greenland Volleyball Federation
 History of Greenland Championship

Greenland League
Greenland League